Rome Urbe Airport is a small civilian airport in Rome, situated in the northern part of the city, between Via Salaria and the Tiber River, about 2.7 NM (5 km, 3.1 mi) inside the Greater Ring Road (Italian: Grande Raccordo Anulare or GRA), the circular motorway around the city.

History 

The airport was inaugurated in Benito Mussolini's presence in 1928, with the name "Littorio Airport" (the name was chosen by Mussolini himself). Until World War II it was the main civilian airport in Italy, and the base for the Italian national airline Ala Littoria. Inside the perimeter also a racetrack was constructed, named Autodromo del Littorio ("Littorio Racetrack"). In 1931 a car/plane challenge took place on the racetrack inside the airport: Vittorio Suster, piloting a Caproni Ca.100, defeated Tazio Nuvolari, who drove an Alfa Romeo 8C 2300.

Heavily damaged by bombardments during the war, the airport was reactivated with the current name in the first postwar years. But just a few years later the commercial activity was transferred to the Ciampino Airport: since that moment the Rome Urbe Airport turned mostly into a facility for flying club activity, touristic flights and air taxi. It is currently the base for the Aeroclub di Roma (Rome's flying club). In 1995 FAR Airlines carried out several trial landings with a de Havilland Dash 7 STOL airliner acquired from Tyrolean Airways. Their plan to link Urbe to several Italian cities failed when the company ceased operations shortly thereafter. In 2010, thanks to the investment of €800.000 by the ENAC (the civil aviation authority of Italy, that manages the airport) a new terminal was opened for helicopters. On 18 September 1997 the airport was the scene for a U2 concert, part of their Pop Mart Tour: a 70,000 audience attended the event

Access 
The Rome Urbe Airport can be reached with public transport by bus or by train: the Nuovo Salario Station (FR1 line) is 400 m from the airport.

References 

Airports in Italy
Airports in Rome
Buildings and structures in Lazio